Lomatium columbianum is a perennial herb of the family Apiaceae known by the common names purple leptotaenia and Columbia desert parsley. It is endemic to the U.S. states of Oregon and Washington, mostly along the Columbia River east of the Cascades.

Description
Lomatium columbianum is a bushy plant, up to 2 meters tall, with extensively divided stems and leaves with a glaucous, often blue-green, color. The flowers are purple and are held in clusters on thick fleshy stems that arise from the base of the plant.

Range and Habitat
Lomatium columbianum is found in the lower Columbia River basin in Washington and Oregon. It grows in dry rocky soils in full sun.

Gallery

References

External links 
 
 

columbianum
Flora of Oregon
Flora of Washington (state)
Flora without expected TNC conservation status